"Leaving Me" is a 1973 crossover single by The Independents.  The single was their biggest on the R&B chart, hitting #1 for one week.  The single, which peaked at number twenty-one, was the only Top 40 hit for the group.  It became a gold record. "Leaving Me" was written and produced by Chuck Jackson and Marvin Yancy.

References

1973 singles
Songs written by Marvin Yancy